M.W. Kellogg Ltd.  (MWKL) was a British full-service contractor primarily serving the hydrocarbon market. It had the capability to execute large international projects from conceptual feasibility studies through fixed-price turnkey mega-projects.

Background
Established in the 1930s, it was a wholly owned subsidiary of the M.W. Kellogg Co. It was a private limited company jointly owned by KBR and JGC Corp. Formal joint ownership between KBR and JGC was established in 1992, when JGC purchased 45 percent of MWKL stock—although a strong relationship between the two companies existed for much longer. It is now wholly owned by KBR after a takeover that occurred December 2010 – January 2011. M.W. Kellogg Ltd. has now changed its name to KBR UK Ltd.
 
MWKL was involved in numerous LNG and GTL projects, notably Woodside in Australia, Oman LNG, Nigeria LNG, Pearl GTL in Qatar and SEGAS LNG in Egypt. In addition to LNG, other major projects have included gas processing facilities, petroleum refineries, fertiliser complexes, and large petrochemical and polymer plants. 

Its largest project was a joint venture with Aker Engineering of Norway, for the full design, supply and construction of the Troll Terminal project in Norway, for Norske Shell,  equivalent sized expansions of Statoil's gas terminal at Karsto, also in Norway. MWKL worked with Statoil for  almost a quarter of a century. During this time, it completed numerous studies and pre-engineering packages for a number of projects, including Mongstad refinery in Norway, Kalundborg refinery in Denmark, methanol plant in Tjeldbergodden, Norway, and Hammerfest plant in  Snohvit, Norway.

References

External links
Official Website

Oil and gas companies of the United Kingdom
JGC Corporation